is the term used for kofun or ancient Japanese tombs ornamented with painted or carved decoration. The tombs take the form of tumuli or earthen mounds piled over stone chambers as well as caves excavated from the living rock. The decoration may be on the inner walls, on stone screens, on sarcophagi or, in the case of cave tombs, around the entrance on the exterior. Of the 161,560 ancient burials identified to date, around two hundred and fifty are so decorated.

Motifs
Decorative motifs include the chokkomon (an X-shape forming triangular zones that intersect irregular curves), circles, concentric circles, triangles, human figures, horses, birds, boats, swords, shields, and quivers.

List of decorated kofun 
This list is of the decorated kofun of ancient Japan, all of which are located in Fukuoka prefecture.

See also
 Kofun period
 Takamatsuzuka kofun
 Kumamoto Prefectural Ancient Burial Mound Museum

Notes

References

External links
  Decorated Tomb Database

Kofun
Japanese painting
Japanese sculpture
Kofun period